Simón Mesa Soto, is a Colombian film director and screenwriter known for his short films Leidi and Madre, and his first feature film Amparo, which had its premiere at the 2021 Cannes Film Festival.

Early years
Simón Mesa Soto was born in Medellin, Colombia. Studied Audiovisual Communication at Universidad de Antioquia, where he also worked as lecturer in film editing before moving to the UK. In 2014 finished his studies in Filmmaking at London Film School. Leidi was his graduation project.

Career
His film Leidi won the Short Film Palme d'Or at the 2014 Cannes Film Festival.

Filmography
 Amparo (2021)

Short films
 Madre (2016)
 Leidi (2014)
 Los tiempos muertos (2009)

References

External links

Colombian film directors
People from Medellín
Alumni of the London Film School